Savatije is a Serbian masculine given name, a variant of Sabbatius. Notable people with the name include:

Savatije Ljubibratić (died 1716), bishop of Dalmatian Serbs
Savatije Sokolović (fl. 1587), Metropolitan of Herzegovina
Savatije Milošević (died 1905), Chetnik in Macedonia
Savatije (fl. 1434), Metropolitan of Braničevo

Serbian masculine given names